Olesa de Montserrat is a municipality in the comarca of Baix Llobregat, in Catalonia, Spain.

Olesa de Montserrat is well known around the nearby places because of its olive oil and textile production, but especially because of its Passion play (La Passió d'Olesa), first documented in 1538. It achieved a world record in 1996, with 726 people acting onstage at the same time.

Main sights
 Torre del Relotge
 Monastery of Sant Pere Sacama
 Rural chapel of Sant Salvador de les Espases

Twin towns
  Nonantola, Italy
  Weingarten, Germany

References

 Panareda Clopés, Josep Maria; Rios Calvet, Jaume; Rabella Vives, Josep Maria (1989). Guia de Catalunya, Barcelona: Caixa de Catalunya.  (Spanish).  (Catalan).

External links 
 Official site
 Government data pages 

Municipalities in Baix Llobregat